The graphic charter of government communication is the graphic charter of the logo of France, used by government services. It was adopted in 1999 by the government of Lionel Jospin and revolves around a logo associating Marianne, the tricolour flag and the motto Liberté, Égalité, Fraternité to represent the French Republic. A redesign of this graphic charter was carried out in 2020.

History 
François Mitterrand, when he was the President of the Republic, was offered by Jacques Séguéla the idea of a logo for state institutions. However, he had refused it, deeming it too publicity.

In 1997, the Court of Auditors noted in a report that a “kaleidoscope of different symbols” existed in the publications of the administration. Its author, Bernard Candiard, who then became director of the Service d'information du Gouvernement (SIG or ), launched the project of creating a logo within this organization, with Nicole Civatte. The objective was to "create an identifier of the State which would clearly indicate that the State exists as a specific issuer: a place where an autonomous word has to be affirmed", according to an internal document issued in March 1999 by SIG.

A call for tenders was launched in 1998, the first example of the State outsourcing its visual communication. The creation of the logo was entrusted to the Audour Soum agency (which then merged with the Hémisphère droit agency, a subsidiary of the Séguéla group), with Evelyn Soum as project manager. Designed by graphic designer Isabelle Bauret, the logo met specifications drawn up "at the end of an investigation combining semiotic analysis, interviews with senior officials, as well as meetings with the general public". It was tested by Sofres to the public and government officials before being released. But the President of the Republic, Jacques Chirac, consulted by the government in January 1999, hesitating at first to "touch the integrity of the flag".

The graphic charter was finally introduced by circular no 4.694 / SG signed by the Prime Minister Lionel Jospin, on 24 September 1999.

The circular no 5459 / SG signed by the Prime Minister Francois Fillon, on 8 April 2010, changed the graphic charter for decentralised services.

The circular no 6144 / SG signed by the Prime Minister Edouard Philippe, on 17 February 2020, simplified the graphic charter and made it more suitable for reading on a smartphone.

Protection 
The first 1999 version of the logo constituted a graphic mark that the SIG has registered with the National Institute of Industrial Property (INPI) under number 7596745 and under the name “Liberté-Égalité-Fraternité République Française” as well as a Community trade mark.

In addition, since 31 March 2016, the logo is one of the emblems protected under Article 6 of the Paris Agreement.

First version (1999)

Description 
The logo reminds the flag of the country in the form of an elongated rectangle containing the three colours: blue, white, red; the white centre part is a silhouette of Marianne in profile, facing right.

Under the rectangle is a typographic base containing:

 on a first line: the motto of the Republic, “Liberté • Égalité • Fraternité”, in italics, with bullets as separations between the words;
 on a second line: the words “République Française”. The capital letter 'F' for “Française”, which did not comply with the rules for using capital letters, was probably introduced for prestige and to recall the monogram “RF”.

The two lines are separated by a filet.

Second version (2020)

Description 
From the first half of 2020, a new graphic charter, called “State brand”, produced by the “4uatre” branding agency, is applied. It incorporates the characteristic elements of its predecessor: Marianne in a French flag and the Republic's motto. Marianne's frame of view is loosened to reveal her shoulders, a new typography (named Marianne) is created and the motto Liberté, Égalité, Fraternité is redrawn by hand in italics and positioned below the official title. The logo therefore consists of the following elements:

 the Marianne block, with Marianne in the white portion of the tricolour
 the official title (for example: “Gouvernement”, “Ministère de la transition écologique et solidaire”, “République française” etc.), in Marianne Bold and on a maximum of six lines
the Republic's motto, Liberté, Égalité, Fraternité, on three lines.

In this brand block, only the official name of the issuer is therefore likely to change, but always retaining the same typography.

Typography 
The Marianne font was created for the State by Mathieu Réguer, commissioned by the agency “4uatre”. It is available in six thickness levels (Thin, Light, Regular, Medium, Bold, Extrabold). As a substitute for this typography, Arial can be used. In addition to Marianne, the Spectral font (created by the Parisian company Production Type for Google in 2017) is authorized for quotes, translations etc.

Application 
The new charter applies, in addition to State administrations (ministries, prefectures, embassies, etc.), to State operators. They will have to affix, in addition to their own logo, the “French Republic” brand block in order to clearly indicate to the public that they belong to the State.

According to the Prime Minister's services, the implementation of the new charter should not generate additional costs, the organizations concerned being supposed to dispose of their old stocks of letterhead.

Colours 
The main colours of the charter are those of the French flag, to which a wide range of secondary colours is also added.

Examples of usage of the logo

Usage 
The 1999 circular specifies that the graphic charter "is intended to be used in all of the ministries' relations with third parties, as well as with other services or bodies under the State". The logo can thus be found on letterheads, business cards, websites, forms, posters etc., published by the government and the administration. The graphic charter applies to ministerial cabinets and central administrations as well as to decentralized services in departments and regions, prefectures and embassies.

The other institutions of the Republic (Presidency of the Republic, National Assembly, Senate, Constitutional Council, Court of Cassation, Council of State, etc.) as well as independent administrative authorities and local authorities generally have their own graphic charter and do not use the government logo.

This logo is moreover a mark and not an official emblem: indeed article 2 of the Constitution of the Fifth Republic officially recognizes only the tricolor flag, the hymn La Marseillaise, and the motto Liberty, Equality, Fraternity.

Reception 
Bernard Candiard, who headed the SIG when the logo was created in 1999, said that it is a national symbol that "endows the country with a modest banner that allows us to come together". The website of the French Embassy in the United States explains that in addition to its goal of unifying government public relations, it was also created to give a more accessible image to the state, which was until present seen as abstract, distant and archaic; it was chosen to unite and mobilize, to offer security and optimism, without forgetting patriotic pride.

The logo brings together three symbols of France drawing their origins from the French Revolution (the flag, Marianne, motto). In the same vein, Frédéric Lambert saw it inspired by La Liberté guidant le peuple by Eugène Delacroix, dating from the revolution of 1830.

However, having been adopted within the framework of cohabitation, it is intended to be consensual, and therefore related more to communication than to the emblem imbued with passion. According to Bernard Richard, it is too associated in the minds of the French with documents such as those of the tax administration (as Pierre Bonte, specialist of Marianne has pointed out) or with traffic tickets notices, which prevents triggering the popular fervor that accompanies other emblems of France; it nevertheless underlines that it was adopted and recognized by the public, as evidenced by the viral success of the hijacking carried out in the aftermath of the attacks of 13 November 2015.

According to historian Maurice Agulhon, it is “more of an aesthetic of a postage stamp than of a logo”. There is indeed a similarity with the stamps representing Marianne. According to the Flags of the World website, the logo is a mix between the two aspects of Marianne described by Agulhon and taken up by Michel Pastoureau in Les Emblèmes de la France - wise and bourgeois on the one hand, rebellious and popular on the other.

In addition, the lack of cohesion between the logos of the different ministries was noted.

Misuses 

On 11 January 2007, activists from several associations, in particular Droit Au Logement (DAL or ), Collectif Jeudi Noir and Macaq (abbreviation of Mouvement d’Animation Culturelle et Artistique de Quartier), denounced the inaction of the public authorities in the housing crisis by inaugurating a fake "Ministry of Housing Crisis" in the 2nd arrondissement of Paris, in the corner of Place de la Bourse and rue de la Banque. A poster diverting the logo of the government was displayed by adding a crowbar and a bunch of keys.

In 2013, in the documentary Trop noire pour être française?, Isabelle Boni-Claverie diverted the logo by replacing the blue of the flag with black and by drawing a black Marianne.

After the attacks of 13 November 2015, graphic designers from the Les Cartons collective hijacked the government logo by adding a tear to the corner of Marianne's eye, in tribute to the victims (of the attacks of 13 November 2015 in France). The visual was widely shared on social networks, and was displayed in Bordeaux on the facade of the Aquitaine regional council.

References 

National symbols of France
Logos
Brand management
1999 in France
Government of France
1999 in politics
2020 in French politics